Ecchaetomyia is a genus of flies in the family Stratiomyidae.

Species
Ecchaetomyia nigrovittata Lindner, 1949

References

Stratiomyidae
Brachycera genera
Taxa named by Erwin Lindner
Diptera of South America